The Tōjō Cabinet is the 40th Cabinet of Japan led by Hideki Tojo from October 18, 1941, to July 22, 1944.

Cabinet

Reorganized Cabinet 
The Cabinet was reorganized on November 1, 1943.

References 

Cabinet of Japan
1941 establishments in Japan
Cabinets established in 1941
Cabinets disestablished in 1944